Lakeside School may refer to:

Lakeside School (Seattle), a private school in Washington, United States
Lakeside School, Chandler's Ford, a special school in Hampshire, England

See also
Lakeside High School (disambiguation)
Lakeside School District (disambiguation)
Lakeside (disambiguation)
Lakeside Academy (disambiguation)
Lakeside College